José J. Reyes (born 1963) is the 22nd Puerto Rico Adjutant General, and the commanding officer of the Puerto Rico National Guard.

Early life and education
Reyes was born in Guaynabo, Puerto Rico and raised in Carolina, Puerto Rico. As a youth he actively participated in the Boy Scouts of America as a member of Troop 572, in his hometown of Carolina. He served as Staff in Guajataka Scout Reservation and was awarded the Vigil Honor of the Order of the Arrow as Secretary of Yokahu Lodge. Has a BBA in Accounting from the University of Puerto Rico and a MSS in Strategic Studies from the United States Army War College. Graduated from the United States Army Command and General Staff College.

Career
Reyes began his military career in 1984 as an active duty enlisted soldier in the United States Army. Commissioned as a 2LT in the active component on the United States Army in 1989. He took the Field Artillery Officer Basic Course at Fort Sill, Oklahoma and later served as Platoon Fire Direction Officer, Battery C, 4th Battalion, 1st Field Artillery, 5th Infantry Division at Fort Polk, Louisiana. Reyes began his career in the Puerto Rico National Guard in April 1994. He was appointed Adjutant General for the Puerto Rico National Guard on January 17, 2019, by Puerto Rico Governor Ricardo Rosselló.

Reyes was promoted to Major General by Governor Rosselló on June 26, 2019. In June 2020, he was nominated for federal recognition of this promotion by President Donald Trump.

Dec 16 Present Assistant Adjutant General, Puerto Rico Joint Force Headquarters, San Juan, Puerto Rico 
Oct 14 Dec 16 Commander, 201st Regiment (MF) Regional Training Institute, Puerto Rico Army National Guard, Juana Diaz, Puerto Rico 
Oct 13 Oct 14 Deputy Director of Intelligence J-2, Joint Forces Headquarters, Puerto Rico Army National Guard, San Juan, Puerto Rico 
Dec 11 Sep 13 Deputy Chief of Staff Operations G-3, Joint Forces Headquarters, Puerto Rico Army National Guard, San Juan, Puerto Rico 
Apr 11 Nov 11 Operations Action Officer, Office of the Deputy Chief of Staff G-3/5/7, Headquarters Department of the Army, Washington, DC 
Oct 10 Apr 11 HQDA G-3/5/7 Liaison/Staff Officer, USF-Iraq 
Oct 05 Sep 10 Operations Action Officer, Office of the Deputy Chief of Staff G-3/5/7, Headquarters Department of the Army, Washington, District of Columbia 
May 5 Oct 05 Operations Officer, HQ STARC, Puerto Rico Army National Guard, San Juan, Puerto Rico 
Jan 3 May 05 Operations Action Officer, Office of the Deputy Chief of Staff G-3/5/7, Headquarters Department of the Army, Washington, District of Columbia 
Apr 02 Jan 03 Brigade Fire Support Officer, 2nd Battalion, 162nd Field Artillery, Puerto Rico Army National Guard, San Juan, Puerto Rico 
Oct 00 Mar 02 Environmental Officer, HQ STARC, Puerto Rico Army National Guard, San Juan, Puerto Rico 
Jun 99 Sep 00 Battalion Motor Officer, HQs 1st Battalion, 162nd Field Artillery, Puerto Rico Army National Guard, San Juan, Puerto Rico 
Aug 97 May 99 Battalion Fire Direction Officer, HQs 1st Battalion, 162nd Field Artillery, Puerto Rico Army National Guard, San Juan, Puerto Rico 
Nov 94 Aug 97 Commander, C Battery, 1st Battalion, 162nd Field Artillery, Puerto Rico Army National Guard, San Juan, Puerto Rico 
Apr 94 Oct 94 Battalion Recon Survey Officer, HQs 1st Battalion, 162nd Field Artillery, Puerto Rico Army National Guard, San Juan, Puerto Rico 
Sep 91 Mar 94 Individual Ready Reserve (Control Group) 
Mar 91 Aug 91 Fire Support Team Chief, HQs 4th Battalion, 1st Field Artillery, 5th Infantry Division, Fort Polk, Louisiana 
Dec 89 Mar 91 Platoon Fire Direction Officer, Battery C, 4th Battalion, 1st Field Artillery, 5th Infantry Division, Fort Polk, Louisiana 
Jun 89 Dec 91 Student, Field Artillery Officer Basic Course, Fort Sill, Oklahoma

Awards and decorations

Badges
  Parachutist badge
  Army Staff Identification Badge

Effective dates of promotions

See also

List of Puerto Rican military personnel
Puerto Rico Adjutant General

References

Living people
People from Guaynabo, Puerto Rico
University of Puerto Rico alumni
United States Army War College alumni
Puerto Rican Army personnel
Puerto Rican military officers
Puerto Rico National Guard personnel
Recipients of the Humanitarian Service Medal
Recipients of the Legion of Merit
Recipients of the Meritorious Service Medal (United States)
United States Army personnel of the Iraq War
United States Army Command and General Staff College alumni
United States Army generals
National Guard (United States) generals
Puerto Rico Adjutant Generals
1963 births